Mikhail Ivanovich Smirnov ( (also spelled Michel Smirnoff; June 18, 1880 – August 26, 1940) was a Russian naval officer, the only Naval Minister of Alexander Kolchak’s Government during the Russian Civil War.

Early life and military career
Mikhail was born in Saint Petersburg on June 18, 1880, into a family of gentry. In 1899, he graduated from the Naval Cadet Corps, his marks being 7th best out of 66, and was appointed midshipman in the Baltic Fleet. In 1900, Smirnov becomes a junior officer at the staff of the Pacific Squadron. Promoted to lieutenant in December 1903.

Russo-Japanese War and afterwards
In 1904-1905, Smirnov participated in the Russo-Japanese War. Initially he served at the fleet headquarters in Vladivostok, later, from January 1905, aboard the cruiser Rossia. The task assigned was primarily disrupting enemy communications. In 1913, Smirnov published a book on the battle of Tsushima. After the war, in 1906, he was appointed to the Navy General Staff in St Petersburg where he first met Alexander Kolchak and became his close associate. Promoted to Senior lieutenant in December 1908. In this rank, he served aboard the battleships Slava and Panteleimon. Promoted to Captain 2nd rank in December 1912.

World War 1
When First World War started, Mikhail Smirnov had recently been appointed captain of the destroyer “Vynoslivy”. In September however he was appointed Russia’s representative with the British Royal Navy. In February 1915, he took part in the bombardment of the Dardanelles fortifications by HMS Lord Nelson. Captain of the destroyer Kazanets from April 1915. In July 1916, Smirnov is appointed to the staff of the Black Sea Fleet, where he meets Kolchak once again, and is promoted to Captain 1st rank. Black Sea Fleet Chief of Staff in 1917, he accompanied Admiral Kolchak in his trips to Britain and USA. During 1917-18 Mikhail Smirnov was in the United States, in charge of the Naval section of the Russian Procurement committee.

Civil War
In November 1918, Smirnov returns to Russia, joining Kolchaks’s Omsk Government as Minister of the Navy, simultaneously promoted to Counter Admiral. The forces he commanded comprised a river flotilla on the Kama (40 ships in total). The tasks of his force included fire support for the White Army, transportation of its units, laying mines, disrupting Reds' communications and river crossings, as well as engaging Red warships directly. Smirnov displayed notable personal courage and skill, contributing to the actions of the White Army, though he was criticized for maintaining an overstaffed ministry. The fleet was lost after the fall of Perm in July 1919. In October 1919 the Ministry left Omsk for Irkutsk with the rest of the government, and in January 1920 Kolchak was overthrown.

Emigration
In January 1920 Mikhail Smirnov left Russia for China, later moving to Berlin where he chaired a mutual help association for former Russian Navy servicemen. Afterwards, Smirnov lived in USA, France and Britain. In 1930, he published a biography of Admiral Kolchak. In 1926, he became a Freemason in London. He died in Liversedge, West Yorkshire, where he was buried. Mikhail Smirnov appears as a character in the 2008 Russian biopic of Alexander Kolchak where he is played by Egor Beroev.

Honours and awards

Russian Empire
 Order of St. Stanislaus, 3rd class (06.12.1902)
 Order of St. Stanislaus, 2nd class (29.03.1909, with swords 31.03.1916)
 Order of St. Anna, 3rd class (06.12.1904. with swords and a bow 18.09.1905)
 Order of St. Anna, 2nd class (28.07.1914) with swords (08.06.1915)
 Order of St. Vladimir, 4th class with swords and a bow (16.03.1915)
 Gold Sword for Bravery (26.08.1916)
 Order of St. Vladimir, 3rd class (06.02.1917)
 Order of St. George, 4th class (27.08.1919)

Foreign
:
 Ordre du Nichan El-Anouar, Officer (12.06.1906)
  Order of the Black Star, Officer (11.01.1910)
  Officer of the Legion of Honour (30.06.1914)

References

1880 births
1940 deaths
Military personnel from Saint Petersburg
Russian Freemasons
White Russian emigrants to the United Kingdom
Recipients of the Gold Sword for Bravery
Russian military personnel of the Russo-Japanese War
Russian military personnel of World War I
White movement admirals
20th-century Russian military personnel
People of the Russian Civil War
Russian admirals
Recipients of the Order of Saint Stanislaus (Russian), 3rd class
Recipients of the Order of Saint Stanislaus (Russian), 2nd class
Recipients of the Order of St. Anna, 3rd class
Recipients of the Order of St. Anna, 2nd class
Recipients of the Order of St. George of the Fourth Degree
Recipients of the Order of St. Vladimir, 4th class
Recipients of the Order of St. Vladimir, 3rd class
Officiers of the Légion d'honneur
Naval Cadet Corps alumni